Darshana Ashoka Kumara is a Sri Lankan journalist as well as a book writer. Darshana is News Editor (English) of Independent Television Network, Sri Lanka.

Darshana used to be a full-time journalist to the Sri Lanka Broadcasting Corporation and a freelancer to Ceylon Today. He has showcased multi-talents, being lyricist and composer in addition to his profession. Darshana has launched 5 books so far in journalism and media studies. His latest book titled Thorathuruwalata Hadawathak presents a critique on the modern-day media practice at the global scale.

He is a fellow of the South Asia Climate Change Award (SACCA) and Asia Journalism Fellowship, Singapore.  He is a computer science graduate of the Sri Jayawardhanapura University and obtained his MA degrees from the Kelaniya University in Mass Communication and Sinhala. Darshana has been awarded with a PhD in Philosophy from the University of Peradeniya.

References

Sinhalese writers
Year of birth missing (living people)
Living people